Kerr is an unincorporated community in southeastern Springfield Township, Gallia County, Ohio, United States.  It has a post office with the ZIP code 45643.

Kerr is part of the Point Pleasant, WV-OH Micropolitan Statistical Area. Public education in the community of Kerr is provided by the Gallia County Local School District.

References

Unincorporated communities in Ohio
Unincorporated communities in Gallia County, Ohio
Point Pleasant micropolitan area